White Zombie is a 1932 American pre-Code horror film independently produced by Edward Halperin and directed by Victor Halperin. The screenplay by Garnett Weston, based on The Magic Island by William Seabrook, is about a young woman's transformation into a zombie at the hands of an evil voodoo master. Bela Lugosi stars as the zombie master "Murder" Legendre, with Madge Bellamy appearing as his victim. Other cast members include Joseph Cawthorn, Robert W. Frazer, John Harron, Brandon Hurst, and George Burr MacAnnan.

Large portions of White Zombie were shot on the Universal Studios lot, borrowing many props and scenery from other horror films of the era. The film opened in New York to negative reception, with reviewers criticizing the film's over-the-top story and weak acting. While the film made a substantial financial profit as an independent feature, it proved less popular than other horror films of the time.

White Zombie is considered the first feature length zombie film; a loose sequel, Revolt of the Zombies, opened in 1936. Modern reception to White Zombie has been more positive. Some critics have praised the film's atmosphere and compared it to the 1940s horror films of Val Lewton, while others still have unfavorable opinions on the quality of the acting.

Plot
On arrival in Haiti, Madeleine Short reunites with her fiancé Neil Parker, with imminent plans to be married. On the way to their lodging, the couple's coach passes Murder Legendre, an evil voodoo master, who observes them with interest. Neil and Madeleine arrive at the home of a wealthy plantation owner, Charles Beaumont. Charles' love of Madeleine prompts him to meet Murder secretly in Murder's sugar cane mill, operated entirely by zombies. Charles wants to convince Madeleine to marry him and solicits Murder's supernatural assistance. Murder states that the only way to help Charles is to transform Madeleine into a zombie with a potion. Beaumont agrees, takes the potion, and surreptitiously gives it to Madeleine. Shortly after Madeleine and Neil's wedding ceremony, the potion takes effect on Madeleine, who soon dies and is buried. Murder and Charles enter Madeleine's tomb at night and bring her back to life as a zombie. In a drunken state, a depressed Neil sees ghostly apparitions of Madeleine and goes to her tomb. On finding it empty, Neil seeks out the assistance of the local missionary, Dr. Bruner, who recounts how Murder turned many of his rivals into zombies, who now act as Murder's closest guardians. The two men journey to Murder's cliffside castle to rescue Madeleine.

At the castle, Charles has begun to regret Madeleine's transformation and begs Murder to return her to life, but Murder refuses. Charles discovers he has been tainted by Murder's voodoo and is also transforming into a zombie. As Neil enters the fortress, Murder senses his presence and silently orders Madeleine to kill Neil. She approaches Neil with a knife, but Bruner grabs her hand from behind a curtain, making her drop the knife and walk away. Neil follows Madeleine to an escarpment, where Murder commands his zombie guardians to kill Neil. Bruner approaches Murder and knocks him out, breaking Murder's mental control over his zombies. Undirected, the zombies topple off the cliff. Murder awakens and eludes Neil and Bruner, but Charles pushes Murder off the cliff. Charles loses his balance and also falls to his death. Murder's death releases Madeleine from her zombie trance, and she awakens to embrace Neil.

Cast

 Bela Lugosi as "Murder" Legendre, a white Haitian voodoo master who commands a crew of zombies
 Madge Bellamy as Madeleine Short, Neil Parker's fiancée, who is turned into a zombie by Legendre
 Joseph Cawthorn as Dr. Bruner: a missionary preacher
 Robert W. Frazer as Charles Beaumont, a plantation owner who is in love with Madeleine
 John Harron as Neil Parker, a bank employee, the fiancé of Madeleine
 Brandon Hurst as Silver, Beaumont's butler
 George Burr Macannan as Von Gelder, a formerly rich man who has fallen under Legendre's spell to become a zombie
 Clarence Muse as a coach driver
 Frederick Peters as Chauvin, a zombie, the former high executioner
 Annette Stone as a maid
 John Printz as Ledot, a zombie, a former witch doctor who was once Legendre's master
 Dan Crimmins as Pierre, an old witch doctor
 Claude Morgan as Garcia, a zombie who used to be a thief
 John Fergusson as Marquee, a zombie who was the chief of the police
 Velma Gresham as the tall maid

Production
The zombie theme of White Zombie was inspired by – but the screenplay not based on – the Broadway play by Kenneth Webb titled Zombie. Webb sued the Halperins for copyright infringement, but did not win his case. Hoping to cash in on the country's interest in voodoo, which began with William B. Seabrook's 1929 book on Haitian voodou, The Magic Island, the film, then titled Zombie, went into development in early 1932. The Halperins leased office space from Universal Studios. Garnett Weston's story focuses more on action than dialogue.  To aid the Halperins, producer Phil Goldstone helped secure funds for White Zombie as he had for other independent films at the time.  Much of the funding came from Amusement Securities Corp.

White Zombie was filmed in eleven days in March 1932 and was shot at the Universal Studios lot, at RKO-Pathé, and in Bronson Canyon on such a small budget – approximately $50,000 – that it had to be filmed at night. Other than Béla Lugosi and Joseph Cawthorn, the majority of the cast in White Zombie were actors whose fame had diminished since the silent film era.

By the time Bela Lugosi appeared in White Zombie, he was already popular with contemporary audiences after his starring role in the hit 1931 film, Dracula and 1932's Murders in the Rue Morgue, and film historians have found it surprising that he would sign on to a low-budget film by producers (the Halperin brothers) with no track record in Hollywood. Sources vary about Lugosi's salary for his week of work on White Zombie. Claims range between US$500 to $900. Richard Sheffield, who was his close friend in the 1950s, reported a payment of $5,000 for White Zombie on Lugosi's tax returns.

The cast and crew's reaction to Lugosi on the set was mixed. Madge Bellamy recalled her collaboration with Lugosi positively, stating that he was very pleasant and that he used to kiss her hand in the morning when they would come on to the set. In contrast, assistant cameraman Enzo Martinelli remarked that "Lugosi wasn't really a friendly type" on set. Actor Clarence Muse, who played the coach driver, claimed that some scenes were partly re-written or re-staged by Lugosi, who also helped to direct some re-takes.

Lugosi's model for his portrayal of "Murder" Legendre in White Zombie may have been the character he played in 1919's Slaves of a Foreign Will (Sklaven fremden Willens), his first German film, in which he played a Svengali-like hypnotist with mesmerizing eyes.

Phil Goldstone had previously worked with Bellamy and offered her the role of Madeleine Short for a salary of $5,000. For the role of Dr. Bruner, the Halperins looked for an actor with name value and decided to cast Joseph Cawthorn, who was then known to audiences only as comic relief in stage and film roles. Set designer Ralph Berger utilized the rented sets of previous films. These sets included the great halls from Dracula, pillars and a hanging balcony from The Hunchback of Notre Dame (1923), the dark corridors from Frankenstein (1931) and chairs from The Cat and the Canary (1927). At RKO-Pathé sets from The King of Kings (1927) were used for the interior of Legendre's castle.

In addition to Berger, assistant director William Cody and sound director L.E. "Pete" Clark earned their first film credit by working on White Zombie. Jack Pierce, Lugosi's make-up artist on White Zombie, had been responsible for the make-up of several other famous horror films of the era including Frankenstein, The Wolf Man, and The Mummy (1932).

Clarence Muse took over the role of the coach driver after principal photography had already begun.  Some footage of the unknown original was used in White Zombie.

The music of White Zombie was supervised by Abe Meyer. Instead of using pre-recorded music, Meyer had orchestras record new versions of compositions for each specific film he was involved in. The music in White Zombie draws from works including Mussorgsky's "Pictures at an Exhibition", Gaston Borch's "Incidental Symphonies", and Hugo Riesenfeld's "Death of the Great Chief". Other pieces on the White Zombie soundtrack include music written by Richard Wagner, H. Maurice Jacquet, Leo Kempenski, and Franz Liszt. The film begins with "Chant", a composition of wordless vocals and drumming, created by Universal Studios employee Guy Bevier Williams, a specialist in ethnic music.

Footage shot for White Zombie was recycled for a follow-up film, Revolt of the Zombies – also made by Halperin Productions – which was released in 1936.

Release
White Zombie experienced distribution problems from the beginning, and went through several film studios including Columbia Studios and Educational Pictures before its initial release. United Artists had been distributing several independent and foreign films that year and bought the rights to release White Zombie. A preview of White Zombies first cut was shown on June 16, 1932, in New York City. This print of White Zombie had a running time of 74 minutes, whereas the regular distribution prints ran for only 69 minutes.

Critical response

Most critical reviews focused on the poor silent era-style acting, stilted dialogue, and over-the-top storyline. William Boehnel of the New York World-Telegram stated: "The plot...is really ridiculous, but not so startlingly so as the acting." Thornton Delehaney of the New York Evening Post wrote, "[T]he story tries to out-Frankenstein Frankenstein, and so earnest is it in its attempt to be thrilling that it overreaches its mark all along the line and resolves into an unintentional and often hilarious comedy." Irene Thirer of the New York Daily News wrote, "Many fantastic and eerie scenes are evolved, but most of them border on ludicrous". Industry trade reviews were more positive. The Film Daily wrote: "It rates with the best of this type of film [...] Bela Lugosi is very impressive and makes the picture worthwhile". Harrison's Reports wrote, "[The film] is certainly not up to the standards of Dracula or Frankenstein, but the types of audience that go for horror pictures will enjoy it".

National media outlet reviewers were generally negative. Commonweal opined, "[The film is] interesting only in measure of its complete failure".  Liberty wrote, "If you do not get a shock out of this thriller, you will get one out of the acting". In Vanity Fairs "Worst Movie of 1932" article, Pare Lorentz wrote about a "terrific deadlock with Blonde Venus holding a slight lead over White Zombie, Bring 'Em Back Alive, and Murders in the Rue Morgue". In the United Kingdom, press was mixed. The Kinematograph Weekly thought the film was "quite well acted, and has good atmosphere" but thought, too, it was "not for the squeamish or the highly intelligent". The Cinema News and Property Gazette thought the film was for the "less sophisticated" and that the "exaggerated treatment of the subject achieves reverse effect to thrill or conviction". Years after the film's release, Victor Halperin expressed a distaste for his horror films: "I don't believe in fear, violence, and horror, so why traffic in them?"

Modern critical reception has been mixed, with critics praising the film's atmosphere while deprecating the acting. Time Out London wrote, "Halperin shoots this poetic melodrama as trance... The unique result constitutes a virtual bridge between classic Universal horror and the later Val Lewton productions." TV Guide gave the film three-and-a-half stars out of four, comparing the film's atmosphere to Carl Dreyer's film Vampyr. However, the magazine described the acting as "woefully inadequate", with the exception of Lugosi. Edward G. Bansk, a Val Lewton biographer, identified several flaws in White Zombie, including poor acting, bad timing and other "haphazard and sloppy" film aspects. Bansk wrote, "Although White Zombie is a film with courage, a film difficult not to admire, its ambitions overstep competence of its principal players." Noting Legendre's statement that obedient zombies "work faithfully and are not worried with long hours," the film has also been seen as an allegory of class exploitation under capitalism and colonialism.

Box office

White Zombie premiered on July 28, 1932, in New York City's Rivoli Theatre. The film received a mixed box office reception upon its initial release, but was a great financial success for an independent film at the time. In 1933 and 1934, the film experienced positive box-office numbers in small towns in the United States, as well as in Germany under the title Flucht von der Teufelsinsel. White Zombie was one of the few American horror films to be approved by the Nazis. The popularity of the film led Victor Halperin to a contract with Paramount Studios.

Opening on July 29, 1932, in Providence, Rhode Island, and Indianapolis, Indiana, the film grossed $9,900 and $5,000, respectively, following one-week engagements. Frankenstein and other contemporary horror films had grossed more in Providence, and the Indianapolis theater "wasn't too happy with White Zombie, but what audiences saw it were pleased enough."  In Cleveland, Ohio, White Zombie sold a record 16,728 tickets its first weekend on its initial release in August. In Montreal, Quebec, Canada, the film opened August 3 at the Princess Theatre. The facade had been transformed into a "House of the Living Dead" and "zombies" walked atop the marquee. The film failed to gross its estimated $8,000 and earned only $6,500 following a one-week run at the Princess Theatre. In comparison, Dracula had grossed $14,000 at Montreal's Palace Theatre during its first week in March 1931.

Home media
White Zombie was transferred from poor quality prints to VHS and Betamax in the 1980s. The film has been released on DVD from several companies – including K-Tel and Alpha Video — with varying image quality. The book Zombie Movies: The Ultimate Guide described the Roan's later DVD release of the title as the best available. The online film database Allmovie features a positive review of the Roan Group's transfer, stating the film "has never looked better". The film was released on Blu-ray on January 29, 2013, from Kino Video.

Aftermath and influence

White Zombie is considered to be the first feature length zombie film and has been described as the archetype and model of all zombie movies. Not many early horror films followed White Zombies Haitian origins style. Other horror films from the 1930s borrowed themes from White Zombie, such as people returning from the dead and other elements of zombie mythology. These films include: The Ghost Breakers (1940), King of the Zombies (1941), I Walked with a Zombie (1943), and The Plague of the Zombies (1966). These films all contain elements from White Zombie including the blank-eyed stares, the voodoo drums, and zombies performing manual labor.

Victor Halperin directed a White Zombie loose sequel, Revolt of the Zombies, which was released in 1936. Béla Lugosi was considered for the role of villain Armand Louque, but the part went to Dean Jagger. Cinematographer Arthur Martinelli and producer Edward Halperin returned. Modern critical response to Revolt of the Zombies is generally unfavorable. In a review from Zombie Movies: The Ultimate Guide, the review declares that "[T]here's no experimentation here, only dull composition shots and flatly lit shots of yakking characters in a by-the-numbers plot." AllMovie rated White Zombie three stars out of five, while it gave Revolt of the Zombies only one star and deemed it far inferior to the original.

Scenes from White Zombie have appeared in other films including Curtis Hanson's The Hand That Rocks the Cradle, Michael Almereyda's Nadja, and Tim Burton's Ed Wood.

The heavy metal band White Zombie appropriated their name from the film. The group's vocalist Rob Zombie said of the film, "[It's] a great film that not a lot of people know about...It amazes me that a film that is so readily available can be so lost." In 1997, the Janus company released a model kit based on the Murder Legendre character.

In 2009, it was announced that Tobe Hooper would direct a remake of White Zombie. Screenwriter Jared Rivet worked on a script in 2007 with Hooper. The project was halted due to rights issues. Rivet explained that White Zombie "is clearly public domain, but there were question marks about uncredited source material."

See also

 Bela Lugosi filmography
 List of American films of 1932
 List of horror films of the 1930s

ReferencesNotesBibliography'

External links 

 
 
 
 
 
 
 

1932 films
1932 horror films
1930s independent films
American black-and-white films
American independent films
American supernatural horror films
American zombie films
1930s English-language films
Films about Voodoo
Films based on American novels
Films directed by Victor Halperin
Films set in castles
Films set in Haiti
Films shot in Los Angeles
Fiction about Haitian Vodou
United Artists films
Articles containing video clips
1930s American films